The 2022–23 Air Force Falcons men's ice hockey season was the 55th season of play for the program and the 17th in the Atlantic Hockey conference. The Falcons represented the United States Air Force Academy and were coached by Frank Serratore, in his 26th season.

Season
By returning most of the previous season's players, Air Force only had one real unknown about the team and that came in goal. With the graduation of Alex Schilling, coach Serratore turned to sophomore Guy Blessing as the Falcons' new starter. The young netminder played a bit inconsistently through the early part of the season but had the team in a good position by Thanksgiving. Unfortunately, it was at that time that the offense began to dry up. The Falcons went on a 9-game losing streak where they scored more then 2 goals on just one occasion. To make matters worse, Blessing had come down with a Bursitis-related injury in early December. He attempted to play through the pain in the series against Holy Cross but it was too much for him to continue. While the team hoped that he would recover after the winter break, Blessing's condition didn't improve enough and he ended up missing the remainder of the season.

In the meantime, a heavy snowfall caused the closure of the Buffalo airport, nessitating that the series with Canisius on December 30-31 be postponed. It was later rescheduled for February 13 and 14.

When the team finally returned to the ice in early January, coach Serratore was forced to alternate between his two upperclassmen goaltenders, Maiszon Balboa and Austin Park. This was caused in part because of the early departure of Aaron Randazzo but also because his replacement, Raymond Picard, had been playing on the Falcons' club team and was only there for emergencies. The two netminders combined to provide a stable situation in goal. Over the second half of the season, the Falcons received a nearly identical quality of goaltending that they had from Blessing. However, the Falcons were not fully able to solve their scoring woes. While the Falcons had a decent amount of depth scoring, they had no top-end players and just two players were able to get into double-digit goal figures. Aside from a brief respite around early February, the entire team had trouble putting the puck in the net. Over the 18 games that Air Force played in 2023, they scored more than 2 goals in just seven of those matches, going 5–2 in those contests. In the others, the team went 1–10 and toubled down the Atlantic Hockey standings, ending up in the conference cellar.

To compound the team's problems, the conference had changed the playoff format before the start of the season, eliminating the first round and starting with the quarterfinals. As a result, the Falcons ended up missing the postseason entirely, marking the first time that Air Force had missed the playoffs since joining the CHA back in 1999.

Departures

Recruiting

Roster
As of August 12, 2022.

Standings

Schedule and results

|-
!colspan=12 style=";" | Exhibition

|-
!colspan=12 style=";" | 

|-
!colspan=12 style=";" | Regular Season

|-
!colspan=12 ! style=""; |

Scoring statistics

Goaltending statistics

Rankings

Note: USCHO did not release a poll in weeks 1, 13, or 26.

References

Air Force Falcons men's ice hockey seasons
Air Force
Air Force
Air Force Falcons men's ice hockey season
Air Force Falcons men's ice hockey season